The 2015 Manly Warringah Sea Eagles season is the 66th in the club's history. Coached by Geoff Toovey and captained by Jamie Lyon, they compete in the National Rugby League's 2015 Telstra Premiership.

Squad movement

Gains

Losses

Ladder

Fixtures

Regular season

Player statistics
Player statistics for the 2015 Manly Warringah Sea Eagles.

2016 Season Awards
Manly Warringah 2016 Club Awards (NRL only):
 Roy Bull Best & Fairest:  Jake Trbojevic;
 Gordon Willoughby Medal - Members’ Player of the Year:  Brett Stewart;
 Doug Daley Memorial Award - Clubman of the Year:  Josh Starling;
 Players’ Player Award:  Brett Stewart;
 Ken Arthurson Award - Rookie of the Year:  Tom Trbojevic;
 Leading point scorer:  Jamie Lyon (110 - 4 tries, 47 goals);
 Leading try scorer:  Brett Stewart (16).

References

Manly Warringah Sea Eagles seasons
Manly-Warringah Sea Eagles season